Mira Mar is a northeastern suburb of Albany, Western Australia, between the Albany city centre and Spencer Park in the local government area of the City of Albany.

Mira Mar was gazetted as a suburb in 1979.

Geography
Mira Mar is bounded by North and Collingwood Roads to the north, Drew Street to the east, Symers Street to the west and Middleton Road to the south. The suburb has a population of 1,682 persons., up from 1,539 at the 2006 election. Strawberry Hill (62 m) and Craggy Bluff dominate the local landscape.

Facilities
Mira Mar contains the Old Farm at Strawberry Hill, which was first a  vegetable farm on Plantagenet Location 44 for the military settlement of King George Sound, and then served as the residence of Albany's first Government Resident, Sir Richard Spencer RN, from 1832 until 1839. Spencer's grave is located on the site. Also in Mira Mar is the simple Victorian Georgian house built in 1872 by Matthew Cull, who was the long-time verger at St John's Church in Albany.

References

Suburbs of Albany, Western Australia